François Jaubert de Passa (born in Céret in 1785 and died in Passa in 1856) was a French engineer and politician.

Biography 

François Jaubert de Passa died in Perpignan on 16 September 1856, at the #4 in Sainte-Dominique street.

Political offices 
François Jaubert de Passa had a political career as a general councillor.
 1836-1846 : General councillor for the canton of Thuir.
 1848-1856 : General councillor for the canton of Vinça.
 5 October 1848 – 25 January 1853 : President of the Pyrénées-Orientales General council.

References

1785 births
1856 deaths
French engineers
People from Céret
19th-century French politicians